Water Works Park is a park area in Tampa, Florida. The park was redeveloped and opened to the public in August 2014. The park includes a section of the Tampa Riverwalk, and extended alongside the Hillsborough River.

The park has an open lawn, children's splash pad and playground, amphitheater and dog park. A memorial garden honoring Clara Frye was built at the park. The Ulele Spring has been restored to flow freely into the Hillsborough River.

References

2014 establishments in Florida
Parks in Tampa, Florida